Highfield is a suburb of Timaru, in the South Canterbury district and Canterbury region of New Zealand's South Island.

Economy

Retail

The Highfield Village Mall includes a New World supermarket.

Demographics

Highfield North, comprising the statistical areas of Highfield North and Highfield South, had a population of 3,609 at the 2018 New Zealand census, an increase of 189 people (5.5%) since the 2013 census, and an increase of 81 people (2.3%) since the 2006 census. There were 1,473 households. There were 1,650 males and 1,959 females, giving a sex ratio of 0.84 males per female, with 600 people (16.6%) aged under 15 years, 546 (15.1%) aged 15 to 29, 1,545 (42.8%) aged 30 to 64, and 924 (25.6%) aged 65 or older.

Ethnicities were 91.2% European/Pākehā, 6.5% Māori, 1.4% Pacific peoples, 4.3% Asian, and 2.6% other ethnicities (totals add to more than 100% since people could identify with multiple ethnicities).

The proportion of people born overseas was 14.7%, compared with 27.1% nationally.

Although some people objected to giving their religion, 45.7% had no religion, 45.0% were Christian, 0.7% were Hindu, 0.2% were Muslim, 0.4% were Buddhist and 1.5% had other religions.

Of those at least 15 years old, 555 (18.4%) people had a bachelor or higher degree, and 636 (21.1%) people had no formal qualifications. The employment status of those at least 15 was that 1,308 (43.5%) people were employed full-time, 486 (16.2%) were part-time, and 78 (2.6%) were unemployed.

Education 
The school was established in 1962.

The school was established in 1911, and became an Anglican Church school in 1926.

Rolls are as of

References

Suburbs of Timaru